The Sulphur Springs Park Reserve is a historic former spa area at the heart of Sulphur Springs, Benton County, Arkansas.  The area is  bounded on the east by Lake LaBelladine, impounded by a dam on Butler Creek which has surviving parts dating to its 1889 construction, and includes landscaped parkland and a cluster of buildings and mineral springs to its west.   The buildings include city hall, a former bathhouse built in 1924 and converted to its present use in 1949.  The mineral springs were developed beginning in 1884 as a curative spa and resort, which resulted in the eventual formation of the city.  Tourism declined in the 1920s, and the property was purchased by John Brown University and used for academic purposes.  By 1956 a portion of the dam had washed out, and the university put the property up for sale.  A local citizen purchased the property and contracted its sale over time to the city.  The dam was repaired with concrete in 1976.

The reserve area was listed on the National Register of Historic Places in 1999.

See also
National Register of Historic Places listings in Benton County, Arkansas

References

Historic districts on the National Register of Historic Places in Arkansas
Parks in Arkansas
National Register of Historic Places in Benton County, Arkansas
Parks on the National Register of Historic Places in Arkansas